Eternal City is a 2008 American romantic comedy film, directed by Jason Goodman.

Plot
When Jonny (Joe Iacovino) arrives in Rome from Philadelphia his destiny becomes intertwined with a filmmaker from New York, a pianist obsessed with her dreams and a nine-fingered piano tuner.

Cast
 Joe Iacovino ... Jonny
 Giulia Steigerwalt ... Angela
 Miriam Candurro ... Silvia
 Fiore Cosimo ... Carabiniere

External links

2008 films
2000s English-language films